Lomas de Solymar, which also contains the area Médanos de Solymar, is a residential neighbourhood and a resort of Ciudad de la Costa in Canelones, Uruguay.

Geography
This resort is located on the Ruta Interbalnearia between Solymar to the west and El Pinar to the east.

Population
In 2011 Lomas de Solymar had a population of 19,124.

Source: Instituto Nacional de Estadística de Uruguay

Street map

References

External links
INE map of Solymar, Lomas de Solymar and Colinas de Solymar

Ciudad de la Costa